László Peter Kollar (1926–2000) was an Australian architect and professor at the University of New South Wales, who was known for his Design Principles, which were influenced by the human condition and spiritual traditions.

Personal life 

Born in Budapest, Hungary, in 1926, Peter Kollar completed his secondary schooling in Hungary in 1944. The following year he enrolled in the architecture program at the Technical University of Budapest and studied there for the next four years.

In 1949, eight months before completing his degree, Kollar fled Hungary after the communist takeover of his country. He then spent some time in Italy working for the International Refugee Organization, while also travelling to Austria and Germany. He sailed to Australia in September 1950, initially staying at Bonegilla, a migrant reception centre in Victoria, before moving to Villawood migrant reception centre in Sydney in late October 1950.

Kollar’s first job in Sydney was as a labourer with the British Australian Lead Manufacturers, but in February 1951 he obtained a position of more personal interest to him — that of architectural draftsman.

Peter Kollar was studying an Associate Diploma (Architecture) part-time when the course was transferred from Sydney Technical College to the New South Wales University of Technology in 1951, thus beginning what was to become a long-term association with this university. 

He graduated in 1953 and four years later, in June 1957, Kollar accepted an appointment as a lecturer in Architecture. His ‘Principles of Design’ lectures were said to have had a profound subject matter which focused on the nature of the human condition informed by a deep understanding of great Spiritual Traditions of the world. Over the years Kollar developed a suite of courses that complemented and elaborated on these principles.

He remained a member of the university’s academic community until his death. In that time he served the university as lecturer, senior lecturer, associate professor and, finally, visiting professor.

He was buried at Macquarie Park Cemetery and Crematorium, Sydney in December 2000.

Design principles

Kollar asserts the primacy of intellect over circumstances; the root of beautiful architecture is in not in material reality but in enlightenment philosophy.  Much of Kollar’s written work is concerned with the duality of Function and Beauty; he argues that there is, hypothetically, an equation wherein Function equals Truth and Truth equals Beauty. He references architectural history only in the spiritual context:

Central to Kollar’s philosophy is the notion that architecture has a responsibility to facilitate human delight and spiritual awareness.

In his Patterns of Delightful Architecture Kollar asserts that this universal delight is only achievable through harmony, lucidity, analogy, ordered geometry and rhythm, a carefully considered relationship between the whole and its many parts, and sensitivity to the various phases or events in the human condition.

Selected published works 

Mechanics of composite structures (co-authored with George Springer)
On Post-modern Architecture
On the Whole and the Part
Patterns of Delightful Architecture
Symbolism in Hindu Architecture as revealed in the Shri Minakshi Sundareswar (photographs by Alan Croker)

Notable projects 

Kollar’s most notable work was the concept design of the Sydney Opera House competition in 1956, in collaboration with associate and fellow Hungarian Balthazar Korab, who had previously worked as a photographer for Eero Saarinen. They placed fourth in the competition which resulted in the winning design by Jørn Utzon. Kollar’s design was ranked the highest out of all Australian entries and was met with high appraisal by judges for its ‘skilful planning’.  However, Kollar continually championed Utzon’s design, even when Utzon omitted himself from the project, recognizing that the Sydney Opera House Utzon had designed was seen as important in a newly liberated design language. The Opera House design Kollar created are some of the highlights in Kollar’s papers, which were deposited at UNSW Archives.

Editor of "Building a masterpiece: The Sydney Opera House" Anne Watson commented on the competition entries including that of Kollar's stating:

Awards 

The University of New South Wales Faculty of the Built Environment annually awards a student with the L. Peter Kollar Memorial Prize for "excellent scholarship making a significant contribution to the promotion of human dignity and social and environmental responsibility with respect for the whole human person in a whole world - the tripartite human nature comprising spirit, mind and body in a world with its corresponding spiritual, subtle and physical dimensions."

References

External links 
University of NSW, The L. Peter Kollar Memorial Prize The L. Peter Kollar Memorial Prize, 2005,
Perspective Drawing of L. Peter Kollar's  competition Entry

1926 births
2000 deaths
University of New South Wales alumni
Academic staff of the University of New South Wales
20th-century Australian architects